The 1840–41 United States Senate elections were held on various dates in various states. As these U.S. Senate elections were prior to the ratification of the Seventeenth Amendment in 1913, senators were chosen by state legislatures. Senators were elected over a wide range of time throughout 1840 and 1841, and a seat may have been filled months late or remained vacant due to legislative deadlock. In these elections, terms were up for the senators in Class 2.

Corresponding with their party's success in the 1840 presidential election, the Whig Party took control of the Senate.

Results summary 
Senate party division, 27th Congress (1841–1843)

 Majority party: Whig (29)
 Minority party: Democratic (22–20)
 Other parties: (0)
 Vacant: (1–3)
 Total seats: 52

Change in composition

Before the elections 
After the November 25, 1840 special elections in North Carolina.

After the elections

Beginning of the next Congress

Race summaries

Special elections during the 26th Congress 
In these elections, the winners were elected during 1840 or in 1841 before March 4; ordered by election date.

Races leading to the 27th Congress 
In these regular elections, the winner was elected for the term beginning March 4, 1841; ordered by state.

All of the elections involved the Class 2 seats.

Special elections during the 27th Congress 
In this special election, the winner was elected in 1841 after March 4; ordered by election date.

Alabama

Alabama (regular)

Alabama (special)

Arkansas

Connecticut (special)

Delaware

Delaware (special)

Delaware (regular)

Georgia

Illinois

Kentucky

Louisiana

Maine

Maryland (special) 

John Leeds Kerr won election to a full term an unknown margin of votes, for the Class 3 seat.

Massachusetts 

There were three elections due to the February 22, 1841, resignation of Whig Daniel Webster to become U.S. Secretary of State and the January 5, 1841, resignation of Whig John Davis to become Governor of Massachusetts.

Massachusetts (special, class 2) 

Whig Isaac C. Bates was elected January 13, 1841, to finish Davis's term.

Massachusetts (regular) 

Bates was also elected January 13, 1841, to the next term.

Bates would only serve, however, until his March 16, 1845, death, and Davis was again elected to the seat.

Massachusetts (special, class 1) 

Whig Rufus Choate was elected February 23, 1841, to finish Webster's term which would continue until 1845.

Michigan

Mississippi

New Hampshire

New Jersey

New York (special) 

Nathaniel P. Tallmadge had been elected as a Jacksonian Democrat in 1833 to this seat, and his term expired March 3, 1839. An election was held February 5, 1839.  Although Tallmadge received the most votes, no candidate received a majority and the seat was declared vacant due to the legislature's failure to elect.

At the State election in November 1839, 7 Whigs and 3 Democrats were elected to the State Senate, which gave the Whigs a majority, the first anti-Bucktails/Jacksonian/Democratic majority in 20 years. The 63rd New York State Legislature met from January 7 to May 14, 1840, at Albany, New York. The strength of the parties in the Assembly, as shown by the vote for Speaker, was: 68 for Whig George Washington Patterson and 56 for Democrat Levi S. Chatfield.

On January 14, 1840, Nathaniel P. Tallmadge received a majority in both the Assembly and the Senate, and was declared elected.

Tallmadge re-took his seat on January 27, 1840, and remained in office until June 17, 1844, when he resigned to be appointed Governor of Wisconsin Territory. Daniel S. Dickinson was appointed to fill the vacancy temporarily, and subsequently elected by the State Legislature to succeed Tallmadge.

North Carolina 

There were three elections due to the November 16, 1840, resignations of Democrats Bedford Brown and Robert Strange.

North Carolina (special, class 2) 

Whig Willie Mangum was elected November 25, 1840, to finish Brown's term that would end in March 1841.

North Carolina (regular) 

Mangum was later re-elected in 1841 to the next term.

North Carolina (special, class 3) 

Whig William Alexander Graham was elected November 25, 1840, to finish Strange's term that would end in 1843.

Pennsylvania 

The election was held on January 14, 1840, after the regularly scheduled election in December 1838 was postponed due to the Buckshot War. Daniel Sturgeon was elected by the Pennsylvania General Assembly to the United States Senate.

Democrat Samuel McKean was elected by the Pennsylvania General Assembly, consisting of the House of Representatives and the Senate, in the 1832–1833 Senate election. Sen. McKean's term was to expire on March 4, 1839, and an election would have occurred during the winter of 1838–1839 elect a senator for the successive term. The election did not occur, however, due to significant political unrest in Harrisburg, the state capital, over disputed election returns during the Buckshot War. McKean's seat was vacated when his term expired in March 1839 and remained vacant until the General Assembly elected a new senator in 1840.

The Pennsylvania General Assembly convened on January 14, 1840, to elect a senator to serve out the remainder of the term that began on March 4, 1839. The results of the vote of both houses combined are as follows:

Rhode Island

South Carolina

Tennessee

Tennessee (special)

Tennessee (regular)

Virginia

Virginia (regular)

Virginia (special)

See also 
 1840 United States elections
 1840 United States presidential election
 1840–41 United States House of Representatives elections
 26th United States Congress
 27th United States Congress

References 

 Party Division in the Senate, 1789–Present, via Senate.gov
Pennsylvania Election Statistics: 1682–2006 from the Wilkes University Election Statistics Project